"Wages Day" is a song by Scottish rock band Deacon Blue, released on 20 February 1989 as the second single from their second album, When the World Knows Your Name (1989). The song reached the top 20 in Ireland, Spain, and the United Kingdom. The main B-side is "Take Me to the Place", which is musically based on the hymn "Abide with Me" and the traditional melody "Eventide".  Some versions of the single contain two songs: "Take the Saints Away" and a cover of Julian Cope's "Trampolene".

Track listings
All songs were written by Ricky Ross except where noted.

7-inch and cassette single 
 "Wages Day"
 "Take Me to the Place" (Ricky Ross, traditional)

7-inch EP and CD single 
 "Wages Day"
 "Take Me to the Place" (Ross, traditional)
 "Take the Saints Away"
 "Trampolene" (Julian Cope)

12-inch single 
A1. "Wages Day (12-inch mix)
B1. "Take Me to the Place" (Ross, traditional)
B2. "Wages Day"

Charts

References

Deacon Blue songs
1989 singles
1989 songs
CBS Records singles
Songs written by Ricky Ross (musician)